Jannik Freese (born 13 August 1986) is a German professional basketball player who plays for Hamburg Towers of Germany's Basketball Bundesliga. He played for Alba Berlin in the 2014–15 season.

References

External links
EuroLeague Profile
German BBL Profile
Eurobasket.com Profile

1986 births
Living people
Alba Berlin players
Basketball Löwen Braunschweig players
Centers (basketball)
Eisbären Bremerhaven players
German men's basketball players
Hamburg Towers players
Sportspeople from Oldenburg